The Croatia national under-20 football team is the national under-20 football team of Croatia and is controlled by the Croatian Football Federation, the governing body for football in Croatia.

History
The U20 team is the de facto under-19 of the previous year, and it acts mainly as a feeder team for the U21s and provides further international development for youth players. The team qualified for its only official match, FIFA U-20 World Cup, depends on U19 result.

Under-20 national team of Croatia was formed in 1994. First match was played against team of Austrian region Styria, and first match against FIFA member was against Italy on 8 February 1995.

Croatia managed to qualify for 1999 FIFA U-20 World Cup. That was second appearance from Croatian football team on FIFA competition, after A-team appeared on FIFA World Cup in France in 1998. They passed the group, and then lost to Brazil by 4–0 in Round of 16.

On 24 July 2010, after trashing Portugal 5–0 in 2010 UEFA European Under-19 Championship group game, Croatia qualified to semi-final and also secured spot in 2011 FIFA U-20 World Cup in Colombia.

Another good performance by U19 team at 2012 championship saw Croatia qualifying for the World Cup, this time to be held in Turkey in 2013.

Competitive record
Croatian under-20 team played most of its matches competing in regional cup called Mirop Cup, also known as Cup Alpe-Adria, with teams of Slovenia, Hungary, Italy, Slovakia and teams of some Austrian and Hungarian regions. Croatia won that cup three times in a row, in 1994, 1995 and 1996, and bever after.

FIFA U-20 World Cup record

Current squad
 The following players were called up for the friendly match.
 Match dates: 1 June 2022
 Opposition: 
 Caps and goals correct as of: 23 March 2022, after the match against 

 Previous squads FIFA U-20 World Cup'''

 1999 FIFA World Youth Championship squad
 2011 FIFA U-20 World Cup squad
 2013 FIFA U-20 World Cup squad

See also 

 Croatia men's national football team
 Croatia men's national football B team
 Croatia men's national under-23 football team
 Croatia men's national under-21 football team
 Croatia men's national under-19 football team
 Croatia men's national under-18 football team
 Croatia men's national under-17 football team
 Croatia men's national under-16 football team
 Croatia men's national under-15 football team
 Croatia women's national football team
 Croatia women's national under-19 football team
 Croatia women's national under-17 football team

References

European national under-20 association football teams
Under-20
Youth football in Croatia